Paluma Dam is an embankment dam across Swamp Creek, situated on the western slopes of the Paluma Range, north of Townsville. The reservoir formed by Paluma Dam is known as Lake Paluma.  Paluma Dam is managed by Townsville City Council.

In addition to the main embankment, there are two saddle dams. The reservoir is surrounded by the Paluma Range National Park, but does not form a part of the park. 

Water decanted from the dam is piped  to the Crystal Creek catchment, on the eastern slopes of the Paluma Range.  This water supplements natural flow in Crystal Creek, which is drawn from for supply of water to the city of Townsville.  Maximum outflow from the dam is 43.2 ML/day.

Paluma Dam was constructed between 1957 and 1958. The original storage capacity was 10,273 ML.  This was increased to 11,496 ML in 1981 and then to 11,830 ML in 2020.  These increases in capacity were achieved by adding flashboards to the spillway.

Paluma Dam can be accessed via Paluma Dam Road.  The lake and the surrounding national park are used for recreational activities such as camping, hiking, swimming and non-motorised boating.

References

External links
 Lake Paluma – Townsville City Council
 Paluma Range National Park

Reservoirs in Queensland
Buildings and structures in Townsville
Dams in Queensland